Xenodiscula is a genus of air-breathing land snails, terrestrial pulmonate gastropod mollusks in the family Sagdidae.

Species 
There are currently two known species in the genus Xenodiscula:
 Xenodiscula taintori
 Xenodiscula venezuelensis

References 

 
Sagdidae
Taxonomy articles created by Polbot